Louis-Armand Chardin, called Chardiny (1755 – 1 October 1793) was an 18th-century French composer.

Biography 
Born in Fécamp, Chardin made his debut at the Paris opera in 1780 as baritone and was finally received the following year. He stood out for the beauty of his voice and the purity of his singing. Nevertheless, he acted coldly and never knew how to enliven the stage. The role which made him most honoured was that of Theseus in Œdipe à Colone.

In 1787 he had l’Anneau perdu et retrouvé performed at the Comédie-Italienne. He is also known for the music of a melodrama entitled: Annette et Basile.

Chardin was one of the first to set music to Florian's romances Estelle and Galatée. His oratorio Retour de Tobie was given at the Concert spirituel the same year. Chardin wrote the recitatives of Paisiello's Le Roi Théodore à Venise, when this work, translated by Moline, was performed at the Opera on 11 September 1787.

It is also necessary to add to the list of his dramatic productions l'Amant sculpteur, opéra comique in one act which was performed at the Théâtre-comique et lyrique in 1790. When in 1792, Piis and Barré established the Théâtre du Vaudeville, they hired Chardin as a "teacher" of their young artists, and as a composer and arranger of the music for their plays.  This job did not prevent Chardin from continuing to be part of the Opera staff, but it did give him the ability to place a relative, perhaps his brother, J. Chardin, in the orchestra of Vaudeville, where he played the cello parts.

Having warmly embraced the party of the Revolution, Chardin was captain of an armed company of the  when he died at age thirty-seven.

Five days after his death, the vaudevillist Piis sent these verses about Chardin to the Journal des Spectacles :

Opera loses a good artist,
Music, a good harmonist,
Vaudeville a good supporter,
The god Comus a good guest;
But what causes everyone a more severe pain,
The Republic, in him, loses a good citizen.

Sources 
 François-Joseph Fétis, Biographie universelle des musiciens, Paris, Firmin-Didot, 1881,.

References

External links 
 Louis-Claude-Armand Chardin, dit Chardiny on Gallica

1755 births
1793 deaths
People from Fécamp
French opera composers
Male opera composers
French operatic baritones
18th-century French singers